Mohamed El Mediouri (born 8 April 1938 in Marrakesh) is the former chief of the personal security, and the senior bodyguard, of King Hassan II of Morocco.

Outside his official security position inside the palace he was the president of Kawakab Marrakesh football club and the Moroccan Athletics federation.

After the death of Hassan II he married the king's widow Lalla Latifa and settled in France. He was discharged of all of his official positions.

El Mediouri was also involved in business, he was the exclusive distributor of Motorola Talkie Walkies in Morocco. His son reportedly still runs this business.

Early life

Mohammed Mediouri started his career as policeman in the CMI (compagnie marocaine d'intervention), the riot control division of the Moroccan police. After the coups attempts of the early 1970s Hassan II realised that his security was insufficient and tasked Raymond Sassia (former bodyguard of Charles de Gaulle) with the formation of a new security for the monarch. Sassia recruited and trained, with the assistance of Hadj Ahmed El Faqir, Mediouri among others, but he became close to the king and he eventually replaced Sassia in the late 1970s as chief of security in the royal palace. In 1999, he married the widow of King Hassan II.

See also
Aziz Jaidi

References

1938 births
Living people
Moroccan police officers
People from Marrakesh
20th-century Moroccan businesspeople
Moroccan expatriates in France
Bodyguards